Pik BAM is a mountain in Zabaykalsky Krai, Russia. It was named after the Baikal Amur Mainline railway, which passes south of it. It is the highest summit of the Kodar Range and the Stanovoy Highlands, as well as of Zabaykalsky Krai. The nearest town is Novaya Chara.

See also
List of highest points of Russian federal subjects
List of mountains and hills of Russia
List of ultras of Northeast Asia

References

External links
 "Pik BAM, Russia" on Peakbagger

Stanovoy Highlands
Highest points of Russian federal subjects